Endless Road, 7058 is the debut studio album released by Spanish boyband Auryn. The album was initially released on October 18, 2011, reaching #4 on the PROMUSICAE official Spanish Albums Chart. The album was subsequently re-released on September 18, 2012, which contains four extra songs, including "Volver", the song they performed during the finals of Destino Eurovisión 2011 in their bid to represent Spain in the Eurovision Song Contest 2011. A deluxe edition containing a CD and DVD was also released, which contained a number of acoustic performances, interviews, music videos and covers of Katy Perry and Coldplay.

Track listing

Charts

Certifications

UReferences

2011 debut albums
Auryn albums